Baker Glacier is a small tributary glacier that enters Whitehall Glacier just north of Martin Hill, in the Victory Mountains of Victoria Land, Antarctica. It was mapped by the United States Geological Survey from surveys and from U.S. Navy air photos, 1960–62, and named by the Advisory Committee on Antarctic Names for John R. Baker, biologist at Hallett Station in 1967–68 and 1968–69.

See also
 List of glaciers in the Antarctic
 Glaciology

References
 

Glaciers of Borchgrevink Coast